One of the northern extensions of the Pamir-Alay system, the Turkestan Range stretches for a total length of 340 km from the Alay Mountains on the border of Kyrgyzstan with Tajikistan to the Samarkand oasis in Uzbekistan. It runs in the east–west direction, north of the Zeravshan Range, forming the southern boundary of the Ferghana Valley in Tajikistan and Golodnaya Steppe in Uzbekistan. The highest elevations are in the east, near the border with Kyrgyzstan. Glaciation occurs especially in the east. The southern slopes are bare cliffs and mountain steppe; the northern slopes are covered with forests. A highway through the Shakhristan Pass at  connects the capital Dushanbe with Khujand in Northern Tajikistan (Sughd Province).

See also
 Geography of Tajikistan

References

External links
 

Mountain ranges of Tajikistan
Mountain ranges of Uzbekistan
Mountain ranges of Kyrgyzstan